Valentin Aleksandrovich "Val" Chmerkovskiy (born March 24, 1986) is a Ukrainian-American professional dancer, best known for his appearances on the U.S. version of Dancing with the Stars, which he won twice. Chmerkovskiy is a two-time World Latin Dance Champion (Junior and Youth) and a 14-time U.S. National Latin Dance champion.

Early life and career 
Chmerkovskiy was born in the Ukrainian city of Odesa, in what was then the Soviet Union. His parents are Aleksandr "Sasha" Chmerkovskiy and Larisa Chmerkovskaya. His older brother, Maksim Chmerkovskiy (born 1980), is also a professional dancer who appears on
Dancing with the Stars. His father is Jewish, and his mother is Christian.

The family moved to the United States in 1994. In 1996, Maksim and Sasha opened a youth-oriented dance studio in New Jersey, and Valentin was one of the students. In 2001, Valentin and partner Diana Olonetskaya, 15, became the first American dance team to win a world junior championship title.

Chmerkovskiy is a co-owner of nine social dance studios under the brand "Dance With Me".  Six are in the New York metropolitan area (Glen Rock and Fort Lee in New Jersey; Glen Cove, Long Island; SoHo, Manhattan; Midtown Manhattan; and Stamford, Connecticut). The three other studios are located in Southlake, Texas, The Woodlands, Texas, and Summerlin, Nevada. Previously one was in Sherman Oaks, California, but has since changed ownership.

Personal life 
In 2015, Chmerkovskiy began an on and off relationship with fellow DWTS dancer Jenna Johnson. In 2017, he confirmed that he and Johnson were dating again. On June 15, 2018, the couple shared their engagement on Instagram. They were married on April 13, 2019. On July 15, 2022, Chmerkovskiy and Johnson announced that they are pregnant and due with their first child in January 2023. Their son, Rome Valentin Chmerkovskiy, was born on January 10, 2023.

Dancing with the Stars 
Chmerkovskiy first appeared on season 2, February 10, 2006, as a student of his brother during Week 6.  The students were:  Valentin & Valeriya Kozharinova, Sergei Onik & Michelle Glazarov and Boris Leokumovich & Nicole Volynets.  The couples performed two numbers.

Chmerkovskiy then appeared once again on season 4 results show on May 8, 2007. He starred in a dance-off against his brother, Maksim Chmerkovskiy.

Chmerkovskiy appeared on the season 10 results show on April 6, 2010.  He did a country western themed routine with his brother Maksim, Edyta Śliwińska and Snejana Petrova.

He appeared on the season 11 results show on October 5, 2010, performing a music and dance duel against Mark Ballas. While performing to the song "Toxic" by Britney Spears, Val played the violin and danced with Lacey Schwimmer.

In season 13, Chmerkovskiy was partnered with model and actress Elisabetta Canalis. They were eliminated second, finishing in 11th place.

In season 14, Chmerkovskiy was partnered with comedian and talk show host Sherri Shepherd. On Rock Week (Week 4) of Dancing with the Stars, they were the third couple to be eliminated, finishing in 10th place.

Chmerkovskiy danced as a professional partner in season 15 with season 1 winner, Kelly Monaco. They finished in third place in the season finale.

For season 16, Chmerkovskiy was partnered with Disney Channel's Shake It Up star, Zendaya. On May 21, Zendaya and Val came in second place behind Derek Hough and Kellie Pickler.

For season 17, he paired with film and television actress Elizabeth Berkley Lauren. Despite receiving high scores, they were eliminated on week 9, finishing in sixth place.

For season 18, he paired with actress and author Danica McKellar. They were eliminated on Week 8 and ended in sixth place.

For season 19, he was paired with Pretty Little Liars actress Janel Parrish. They made it to the finals and finished in third place.

For season 20, he was paired with actress and singer Rumer Willis. On May 19, 2015, Willis and Chmerkovskiy were crowned the winners, marking Chmerkovskiy's first win.

For season 21, he was partnered with R&B singer and reality television star, Tamar Braxton. On November 11, 2015, Braxton revealed that she had to withdraw from the competition due to health issues.

For season 22, he was partnered with meteorologist Ginger Zee. The couple made it to the finals, but ultimately ended in third place.

For season 23, he was partnered with Olympic artistic gymnast Laurie Hernandez. On November 22, Hernandez and Chmerkovskiy won the title, giving Chmerkovskiy his 2nd mirrorball.

For season 24, he was partnered with Fifth Harmony singer Normani Kordei. They made it to the finals and finished in third place.

For season 25, he was partnered with former Paralympic swimmer Victoria Arlen. They made it to the semi-finals in week 9 but were then eliminated, finishing in fifth place.

Chmerkovskiy did not return for season 26, but he was revealed to be back for season 27 where he was paired with actress Nancy McKeon. They were the third couple to be eliminated, finishing in 11th place.

For season 28, he returned where he was originally paired with model and actress Christie Brinkley. However, five days before the premiere, she withdrew from the competition due to a broken arm sustained in rehearsals. As a result, Brinkley's daughter and model Sailor Brinkley-Cook stepped in as a replacement. Despite consistently earning high scores, the couple was surprisingly eliminated on week 6 and finished in ninth place.

For season 29, he was paired with cheerleading coach and reality television star Monica Aldama.

For season 30, he was partnered with influencer Olivia Jade.

For season 31, he was partnered with The Bachelorette star Gabby Windey. They made it to the finals and finished in second place behind Charli D'Amelio and Mark Ballas. 

Coincidentally, Val has had the same outcome in his first four seasons on Dancing with the Stars as his older brother Maksim had on his first four seasons on the show; eliminated before the finals on his first two seasons, third place on his third, and the runner-up on his fourth season.
Val shares a record originally set by Mark Ballas of having the most celebrity partners (four) to never individually score less than 8 from any judge. He is also the only professional to go three consecutive seasons without ever scoring less than an eight (16, 17, 18) with Zendaya, Elizabeth Berkley Lauren & Danica McKellar.
Val and his season 19 partner Janel Parrish hold the record for the earliest perfect score, receiving it during week 3 (matched by Bethany Mota & Derek Hough later in the same show and by Juan Pablo Di Pace & Cheryl Burke in season 27).

References

External links 
http://www.sportdance.ie/bank/4808.html
http://www.pbs.org/wgbh/ballroomchallenge/competition-s2-ep4.html
http://dancesportinfo.net/Dancer/7170/Details.aspx

1986 births
Living people
Dancers from Odesa
Dancing with the Stars (American TV series) winners
Odesa Jews
The Hudson School alumni
Ukrainian emigrants to the United States
American people of Ukrainian-Jewish descent
Naturalized citizens of the United States